Elsa Johanna Nilsson (born October 1, 1973, in Uppsala) is a Swedish author. She has published books under the pseudonym Amanda Lind. She has been the recipient of a Wahlström & Widstrands litteraturpris in 2004, and a Karin Boyes litterära pris in 2005.

References 

1973 births
Living people
21st-century Swedish writers
21st-century Swedish women writers
21st-century pseudonymous writers
Pseudonymous women writers